Nyungwe may refer to:

 Nyungwe language, also called Cinyungwe, a Bantu language spoken in Mozambique
 Nyungwe Forest, a national park in Rwanda